Life Together (French: La Vie à deux) is a 1958 French comedy film directed by Clément Duhour. It features an ensemble star cast including Fernandel, Pierre Brasseur Lilli Palmer, Danielle Darrieux, Jean Marais, Edwige Feuillère, Gérard Philipe and Sophie Desmarets. The screenplay was written by Sacha Guitry, his final work before his death the same year.

It was shot at the Billancourt Studios in Paris and on location in Nice including at the Hotel Negresco. The film's sets were designed by the art director Raymond Gabutti.

Synopsis
A celebrated writer has made a fortune by writing a successful book about four loving couples. Many years later he considers leaving them money in his will and sends out researchers to find if they are still as happy at they once were.

Cast 
 Pierre Brasseur as Pierre Carreau
 Danielle Darrieux as Monique Lebeaut
 Sophie Desmarets as Marguerite Caboufigue, wife of Marcel
 Fernandel as Marcel Caboufigue, the husband of Marguerite
 Edwige Feuillère as  Françoise Sellier, ex-Carreau
 Robert Lamoureux as  Thierry Raval, the lover of Monica
 Louis de Funès as Maître Stéphane, the notary
 Jean Marais as Teddy Brooks, the illusionist
 Lilli Palmer as Odette de Starenberg, the minister's girlfriend
 Gérard Philipe as Désiré, Odette's new valet
 Jean Richard as André Le Lorrain
 Pauline Carton as Mrs Vattier, wife of directeur
 Mathilde Casadesus as Adèle, cuisine of Odette
 Marie Daëms as Madeleine
 Ivan Desny as Michel Sellier
 Jacques Dumesnil as Professor Henri Girane
 Christian Duvaleix as Jean Pommier, généalogiste
 Jacques Jouanneau as Sentis, généalogiste
 Madeleine Lebeau as Peggy
 Robert Manuel as Georges
 Jane Marken as Madame Fourneau
 Maria Mauban as La soeur-infirmière
 Pierre Mondy as Monsieur Lebeaut
 Jacques Morel as Claude
 Jean Tissier as Arthur Vattier
 Palmyre Levasseur as Marie
 Raoul Marco as Doctor Leclerc

References

Bibliography
 Harding, James. Sacha Guitry: the Last Boulevardier. Methuen, 1968.

External links 
 
 La Vie à deux (1958) at the Films de France

1958 films
French comedy films
1950s French-language films
French black-and-white films
Films based on works by Sacha Guitry
Films set in Nice
Films shot in Nice
Films shot at Billancourt Studios
1950s French films